William Herbert Hudnut III (October 17, 1932 – December 18, 2016) was the 45th mayor of Indianapolis from 1976 to 1992. A Republican, his four terms made him the city's longest-serving mayor. He had previously represented the Indianapolis area in Congress from 1973 to 1975 but was defeated in his race for a second term.

Early life and career
Hudnut was born in Cincinnati, Ohio, on October 17, 1932. He attended the Darrow School in New Lebanon, New York, and graduated from Princeton University in 1954 with an A.B. in history and was elected to Phi Beta Kappa. As part of his undergraduate degree, Hudnut completed a senior thesis titled "Samuel Stanhope Smith: Enlightened Conservative." He earned a Master's Degree in Theology from the Union Theological Seminary in the City of New York and was ordained a clergyman in 1957.

Hudnut was an ordained minister in the Presbyterian Church and was the senior pastor of Second Presbyterian Church in Indianapolis from 1964 to 1972. He led the congregation with a moderate but active stance through the social issues of the 1960s, including the Vietnam War and race relations. He had previously served churches in Buffalo, NY and Annapolis, MD.

In the 1972 Republican primary for Indiana's 11th congressional district, Hudnut defeated future Congressman Dan Burton. After winning the general election against four-term Congressman Andrew Jacobs, Jr., he served only one term in the 93rd United States Congress. While in Congress he sponsored seventeen bills that became law, but he lost his reelection bid to Jacobs.

Hudnut received honorary degrees from 13 colleges and universities. In 1974, he became a Freemason in Irvington Lodge No. 666, which was later absorbed by Prospect Lodge 714. He was also a member of the Antelope Club.

Mayor of Indianapolis
Hudnut became the mayor of Indianapolis in 1976. taking over from Richard Lugar, who had been the architect of  the Unigov legislation that merged the government structures of Indianapolis and Marion County.  Hudnut's goal was to change the city from "India-NO-place" to "India-SHOW-place." His mayorship was defined by economic development in Downtown Indianapolis, business, construction, and sports.

Hudnut's policies were entrepreneurial, and he hoped to attract economic development by taking risks with raising taxes and issuing bonds. He opposed deficit spending and kept the city's bond rating at AAA. He aimed for job growth, a widened tax base, and law and order. The city spent large amounts on tax incentives, infrastructure improvements, and development projects to attract business to the downtown area.

Over the sixteen years of his term, more than 30 major building projects took place downtown, including renovations and expansions to Monument Circle, Indianapolis Union Station, the Indiana University School of Medicine, and the Indiana Convention Center. Many office buildings were constructed, and companies such as Eli Lilly and American United Life committed to staying in Indianapolis.

Indianapolis became known as the Amateur Sports Capital of the World, due in part to Hudnut's efforts at marketing the city. While mayor, Indianapolis held the 1987 Pan American Games and the 1982 National Sports Festival. Hudnut formed the Indiana Sports Corporation, which directed sporting projects such as the Indianapolis Tennis Center, the Major Taylor Velodrome, and the IUPUI Natatorium. In 1980 Hudnut formed a committee on building a new stadium to attract a National Football League team. With the newly built Hoosier Dome and other incentives, he secretly negotiated with then-Colts owner Robert Irsay to bring the Colts to Indianapolis from Baltimore. On March 29, 1984 he organized the team's middle-of-the-night departure to Indianapolis with Mayflower moving vans, and he called it "one of the greatest days in the history of this city."

Hudnut was also president of the National League of Cities and a member of the board for over twenty years. In 1988, Hudnut was named City & State magazine's Nation's Most Valuable Public Official. In 1985 he earned the Distinguished Public Service Award from the Indiana Association of Cities and Towns and in 1986 a Woodrow Wilson Award for Public Service.

Hudnut was a presidential elector in the 1980 Presidential election.

In 1990, Hudnut ran for Indiana Secretary of State, but lost to Joe Hogsett. He chose not to run for a fifth term as mayor in 1991.

In 2015, Hudnut was among five current and former mayors to oppose the Religious Freedom Restoration Act, arguing that it would undo the efforts of making Indianapolis an "inclusive, caring, and hospitable city".

Later career
Hudnut served at the Hudson Institute in Indianapolis 1992 to 1994, and was President of the Civic Federation in Chicago 1994 to 1996. In 2004, Hudnut took office as the mayor of the town of Chevy Chase, Maryland. He held the Joseph C. Canizaro Chair for Public Policy for the Urban Land Institute in Washington, D.C. from 1996 to 2010. He then taught at the School of Continuing Studies at Georgetown University in the MPS Real Estate Program, of which he became executive director.

Hudnut authored five books:
Minister Mayor, 1987, about his political and religious experiences
The Hudnut Years in Indianapolis, 1976–1991, 1995, about city leadership
Cities on the Rebound, 1998, an analysis of future successful cities
Halfway to Everywhere, 2003, about America's best suburbs
Changing Metropolitan America: Planning for a More Sustainable Future, 2008

In December 2014, Hudnut returned to Indianapolis for the unveiling of the "Mayor Bill" statue on the corner of Maryland Street and Capitol Avenue.

Electoral history

Personal life
Hudnut was married three times. His first marriage was to Anne Goodyear, granddaughter of Anson Conger Goodyear (1877–1964). Before their divorce in 1974, the couple had five children, four sons and a daughter. On December 14, 1974, he married for a second time to Susan Greer Rice, a real estate agent. They divorced in 1988. In 1989, his third and final marriage was to Beverly Guidara (b. 1959), his former press secretary. They had a son.

In March 2015, Hudnut announced that he had congestive heart failure and throat cancer.

Hudnut died on December 18, 2016 at the age of 84.

References

External links

William H. Hudnut, III Collection at the Digital Mayoral Archives, University of Indianapolis

1932 births
2016 deaths
American Presbyterian ministers
Maryland Republicans
Mayors of Indianapolis
Mayors of places in Maryland
Republican Party members of the United States House of Representatives from Indiana
Politicians from Cincinnati
Princeton University alumni
Writers from Indiana
Writers from Maryland
Writers from Cincinnati
20th-century American politicians
Darrow School alumni
Goodyear family (New York)